Aiman Anwer (born 14 September 1991) is a Pakistani cricketer who plays primarily as a right-arm medium-fast bowler for Pakistan. She has also played domestic cricket for Karachi, Sindh, Saif Sports Saga and Zarai Taraqiati Bank Limited.

International career
On 5 July 2016 Aiman made her Women's Twenty20 International (WT20I) debut during Pakistan's tour of England. She made her Women's One Day International (WODI) debut against Bangladesh in the 2017 Women's Cricket World Cup Qualifier on 8 February 2017.

In October 2018, she was named in Pakistan's squad for the 2018 ICC Women's World Twenty20 tournament in the West Indies. In January 2020, she was named in Pakistan's squad for the 2020 ICC Women's T20 World Cup in Australia. In October 2021, she was named in Pakistan's team for the 2021 Women's Cricket World Cup Qualifier tournament in Zimbabwe. In January 2022, she was named in Pakistan's team for the 2022 Women's Cricket World Cup in New Zealand. In May 2022, she was named in Pakistan's team for the cricket tournament at the 2022 Commonwealth Games in Birmingham, England.

References

External links
 
 

1991 births
Living people
Cricketers from Karachi
Pakistani women cricketers
Pakistan women One Day International cricketers
Pakistan women Twenty20 International cricketers
Karachi women cricketers
Sindh women cricketers
Saif Sports Saga women cricketers
Zarai Taraqiati Bank Limited women cricketers
Cricketers at the 2022 Commonwealth Games
Commonwealth Games competitors for Pakistan